Pulyeh (also Romanized as Pūlyeh; also known as Pūleh and Pūlīā) is a village in Oshnavieh-ye Shomali Rural District, in the Central District of Oshnavieh County, West Azerbaijan Province, Iran. At the 2006 census, its population was 137, in 26 families.

References 

Populated places in Oshnavieh County